"Transformation" is a 2017 single by Van Morrison from the album Roll with the Punches. It was the album's lead single, released on September 22 that same year.

Song info
The song was inspired by Van Morrison's membership of the philosophical American organization, the Agape International Spiritual Center, which Morrison himself states to be "spiritual" and "beyond religion". "Transformation" features Jeff Beck playing guitar, as well as pianist Jason Rebello on piano and singer Chris Farlowe on background vocals.

Charts and critical reception
"Transformation" was only released as a download single, reached number one on the radio airplay chart in Egypt. AllMusic describes the song as "a trademark Celtic R&B tune and the set's outlier" also adding "his vocal interaction with Beck's tasty slide guitar is irresistible." Spillmagazine described the song as having "beautiful melody, heartfelt lyrics, reminiscing and religious imagery" and stating that "had it been released in the mid 1970's, it would be considered a classic now."

References

2017 singles
Van Morrison songs